Sophie Dorothea Friederike Krüger, alias August Lübeck or Auguste Krüger (8 October 1789, Friedland, Mecklenburg - 31 May 1848, Templin) was a soldier in the Prussian army.

Life 

Krüger served disguised as a man during the Napoleonic Wars in Germany from 1813 to 1815 in the first company of the Colbergsches Infanterie Regiment (renamed Colbergsche Grenadier-Regiment Graf Gneisenau (2. Pommersches) Nr. 9 in 1889).

Trained as a tailor, at 23 years old she cut off her hair, put on a male costume she had designed herself and obeyed a mobilization proclamation. Owing to the speed of mobilization there were no medical examinations and so she was not discovered at first. Her comrades admired her courage very much and were loyal to her, but during one attack her high voice caused the others to realize that she was female. However, she was not discharged from the army and was even allowed by King Frederick William III of Prussia to continue serving under her real name. She was promoted to corporal after the Battle of Möckern. She was then promoted to sergeant after the Battle of Dennewitz and subsequently fought in the Battle of Waterloo in 1815.

At the end of the war she married a Prussian corporal, Karl Köhler, on 5 March 1816 and left the army. They had four children. She was awarded the Iron Cross and the Commemorative War Medal by King Frederick William for her bravery. On her death, she was buried in the St.-Georgen-Friedhof in Templin, where her grave can still be seen.

References

Life (German)

1789 births
1848 deaths
People from Friedland, Mecklenburg-Vorpommern
Prussian Army personnel of the Napoleonic Wars
Women in 19th-century warfare
Female wartime cross-dressers
Women in European warfare